Eocercomonas is a genus of cercozoa.

It is includes the species Eocercomonas ramosa.

References

Sarcomonadea
Cercozoa genera
Monotypic SAR supergroup genera